Mid-Century Loves is a 1954 Italian anthology historical melodrama film consisting of five segments directed by Glauco Pellegrini, Pietro Germi, Mario Chiari, Roberto Rossellini and Antonio Pietrangeli.

Plot

Episode # 01: "Romantic love", directed by: Glauco Pellegrini 
In 1900 Elena, a young man from a rich bourgeois family, falls in love with the musician Mario. Her father and her aunt Matilde, however, would like the girl to marry a rich count. When Mario leaves for his tour, Matilde promises both young people to foster their feelings, while she actually destroys the letters they send each other, and persuades Elena that Mario has forgotten her. Elena ends up marrying the count.

Episode # 02: "War 1915-18", directed by: Pietro Germi 
During the First World War, in a small Abruzzo village the very young lovers Antonio and Carmela get married and are expecting a child. Antonio is called to the front between the draft of 1900: Carmela and all friends and acquaintances are very proud of him and confidently await the end of the war. In the end the victory is announced and the celebrations are unleashed in the town: still no one knows that Antonio was killed in his first assault with the Sicily Brigade.

Episode # 03: "Postwar 1920", directed by: Mario Chiari 
Alberto, an exalted squadist, leaves his country greeting his relatives and his girlfriend Susanna to take part in the March on Rome. In reality, he is mainly interested in Rome's nightlife and beautiful women. Susanna joins him in disguise and discovers him in a tabarin in equivocal attitudes with an entrîneuse, to whom she does not fail to reveal her contempt for her peasant girlfriend. But Susanna is not far behind in terms of beauty and sensuality, so much so that she is hired for a provocative number in the part of Salome, and she takes the opportunity to take her revenge on Alberto.

Episode # 04: "Naples 1943", directed by: Roberto Rossellini 
During the bombings of the Second World War, actors and extras engaged in rehearsals at the Teatro di San Carlo rush into the air-raid shelter, and there the extra Carla and the airman Renato fall in love, but will be divided by death.

Episode # 05: "Girandola 1910", directed by: Antonio Pietrangeli 
We are in the belle époque. A doctor advises a patient to limit his sexual activity; this however asks the doctor to mediate with his mistress so that she is less demanding. The woman is also having another relationship, and she too begs the doctor to intervene discreetly with the second man; and so on until among the whirlwind of lovers the doctor recognizes his wife.

Cast

L'amore romantico 
 Franco Interlenghi: Mario  
 Leonora Ruffo: Elena  
 Paola Borboni: Matilde 
 Carlo Ninchi:   Elena's father  
 Luigi Tosi: Count Edoardo Savelli

Girandola 1910 
 Lea Padovani: Isabella   
 Andrea Checchi: Gabriele  
 Umberto Melnati: Cocò, the policeman
 Carlo Campanini: Michelangelo, the doctor 
 Franco Scandurra

Guerra 1915-18 
 Maria Pia Casilio: Carmela  
 Albino Cocco: Antonio  
 Lauro Gazzolo: the master 
 Amedeo Trilli

Dopoguerra 1920 
 Alberto Sordi: Alberto  
 Silvana Pampanini: Susanna  
 Giuseppe Porelli: Fosco D'Agata  
 Alba Arnova: Yvonne  
 Arturo Bragaglia: zio di Alberto  
 Franco Migliacci

Napoli 1943 
 Antonella Lualdi: Carla  
 Franco Pastorino: Renato  
 Ugo D'Alessio

References

External links

   

1954 films
Italian drama films
Italian romance films
Italian historical films
1954 drama films
1950s romance films
1950s historical films
Films directed by Roberto Rossellini
Films directed by Pietro Germi
Films directed by Antonio Pietrangeli
Films directed by Glauco Pellegrini
Films scored by Carlo Rustichelli
Melodrama films
1950s Italian films